Tarila Emmanuel Thompson (born February 14, 1968) is a Nigerian actor, director, filmmaker, writer and musician. Thompson began his career in 1992 and is credited for his role in pioneering the English-speaking movie industry in Nigeria known as Nollywood.

Thompson is known for Love without Language (1993), Die Another Day (2004), Passion and Pain (2004) and Church Business (2006). After taking a break from filming, Thompson came back in 2012 to shoot his latest film In the Creek, a film which has been tagged Africa's most expensive export. The film talks about the pains of the Niger-Delta people in Nigeria. As a musician, he is the owner of El-Montage Records, a music record label.

Personal life and education

Thompson was born in Lagos, Nigeria. He hails from Bayelsa State, a state in the Niger-Delta region. Thompson acquired a bachelor's degree from the University of Science and Technology, Port-Harcourt. He is married to Funto Diseye Thompson and has three children.

Career

Thompson began his career in 1993 in Love without Language. Thompson said of the movie that it was at a time when people only made films in the indigenous Nigerian language.

To date, Thompson has several movies, both locally and internationally, including Power of Love (2002), Passion and Pain (2003), Church Business (2003), Die Another Day (2004), Above the Crown (2006) and In the Creek (soon to be released).

References

Living people
Nigerian male film actors
1968 births
Nigerian male musicians
Nigerian film directors
20th-century Nigerian male actors
21st-century Nigerian male actors
Nigerian male writers
People from Bayelsa State
Rivers State University alumni
Nigerian entertainment industry businesspeople
20th-century births